The Australian Natives' Association (ANA) was a mutual society founded in Melbourne, Australia in April 1871. From 1877, the ANA elected a Chief President at their Annual Conference held at different cities each year. The ANA ceased having a Chief President in 1993, following their merger of certain operations with Manchester Unity IOOF of Victoria to create Australian Unity.

Chief presidents

References

Lists of Australian people